Anson Stager (April 20, 1825 - March 26, 1885) was the co-founder of Western Union, the first president of Western Electric Manufacturing Company and a Union Army officer, where he was head of the Military Telegraph Department during the American Civil War.

Biography
He was born in Ontario County, New York. At age sixteen, Stager began working as an apprentice on the Rochester Daily Advertiser  for a printer and telegraph builder named Henry O'Reilly of Rochester, New York. After the latter had a telegraph line constructed from Philadelphia to Harrisburg he placed Stager in operator positions in Philadelphia and Pittsburgh, and then at age 21 he was put in charge of the first Lancaster, Pennsylvania, office in 1846. In the spring of 1848, he was made chief operator of the "National lines" at Cincinnati, Ohio, where he made several improvements in battery and wire arrangement. In 1852 Stager was promoted to superintendent, and also served as the first general superintendent of Western Union Company, newly consolidated in 1856.

After the Civil War broke out in April 1861, Stager was requested by Ohio governor William Dennison, Jr. to manage the telegraphs in southern Ohio and along the Virginia Line. Stager obliged and immediately prepared a cipher by which he could securely communicate with those who had the key (notably the governors of Illinois and Indiana). In October he was called to Washington and appointed head of the Military Telegraph Department, which oversaw government telegraphs in all departments. He remained in service until 1866, continuing to lead the department as civilian until September 1868; and was made a brevet brigadier general of volunteers for his war service.

In 1869  Stager moved to Chicago, Illinois, where he served as president of Western Electric. He was also president of the Chicago Telephone Company and president of the Western Edison Company, and secured a consolidation of the two.

Anson Stager died in Chicago, Illinois, on March 26, 1885, and was survived by three daughters. His daughter Ellen Stager would marry Arthur Butler, 4th Marquess of Ormonde in 1887 and had four children.

See also

List of American Civil War brevet generals

References

Further reading
Robert Luther Thompson, Wiring A Continent, The History of the Telegraph Industry in the United States, Princeton University Press, 1947

External links
 
 

1825 births
1885 deaths
People from Ontario County, New York
People of New York (state) in the American Civil War
Union Army colonels
Telegraphists
Western Union people